{{Infobox software
| name = 
| logo = Colors! logo.png
| logo alt = 
| logo caption = 
| screenshot = 
| screenshot size =
| screenshot alt = 
| caption = 
| author = Jens Andersson
| developer = Collecting Smiles
| released = 2007
| discontinued = 
| operating system = 
| platform = {{ubl|Colors!: Nintendo DS, PlayStation Vita, iOS, Android|Colors! 3D: Nintendo 3DS|Colors Live: Nintendo Switch}}
| size = 
| language = 
| language count = 
| language footnote = 
| genre = Raster graphics editor
| license = 
| website = 
}}Colors! is a series of a digital painting applications for handheld game consoles and mobile devices. Originally created as a homebrew application for Nintendo DS (as Colors!), which was since legitimately distributed on PlayStation Vita, iOS, and Android, the project eventually evolved into an officially licensed application for Nintendo 3DS (as Colors! 3D) and Nintendo Switch (as Colors Live).

History

Colors! 
Colors! was originally released in June 2007 as a simple homebrew painting application for the Nintendo DS. It was developed by Jens Andersson, a programmer and designer who was on sabbatical from the games industry and wanted to experiment with the potential of the new handheld platform. Shortly after, Rafał Piasek created an online gallery where users could upload paintings made with the program.

Colors! quickly became one of the best-known homebrew applications on the Nintendo DS and, in September 2008, it was also released for the iPhone and iPod Touch. As of August 2010, it had been downloaded almost half a million times. It was voted the most popular homebrew application on the Nintendo DS by readers of the R4 for DS blog.

Development of Colors! DS homebrew officially came to an end in December 2010 although the official gallery still accepted submissions from DS users until 2020 and the unofficial forums remain active.

Colors! 3D 
Colors! 3D is a successor to the application Colors! for the Nintendo 3DS. It was released as an officially licensed application for the Nintendo eShop in North America on April 5, 2012, and in the PAL region on April 19, 2012. It was later released in Japan on August 21, 2013, published by Arc System Works.

Colors! 3D allows users to draw on five layers, each on their own stereoscopic 3D plane. Drawing is done on the bottom screen while the top screen displays the painting in 3D. While drawing, players can use the various controls on the Nintendo 3DS to change layers, zoom and pan, and alter the pressure of their brush. Pressing the L button allows users to access a menu where they can change brush type, size and opacity, modify the layers, use the camera to provide reference and more. When the user is finished with their painting, they can export it to the SD card for viewing in the Nintendo 3DS Camera application. Users can also upload their finished creations to an online gallery, which can be viewed either on the 3DS or on the official website. Gallery features include use of hashtags, and the ability to follow artists and post comments. Each painting also features a replay feature that allows viewers to see how it was drawn. The application also features local multiplayer, allowing several people to work cooperatively on a painting.

Reception 
IGN gave the application a score of 9.0 and an Editor's Choice award, praising its simple interface and tutorials. Destructoid gave the app a 9.0, calling it "a simple and incredibly fun tool with an amazing community of artists proudly displaying their beautiful and funny 3D images." Nintendo Life gave the app a 9/10, stating, "Though lacking in any type of structured play, Colors! 3D’s robust free drawing system and unique ability to let anyone create their own three-dimensional artwork more than make up for this."

Colors Live 
A Nintendo Switch successor called Colors Live (stylised as Colors L!ve) was released in 2020 after being funded via a Kickstarter campaign. It features a pressure-sensitive pen called the Colors SonarPen and a new game mode called Colors Quest. This new adventure has a unique way of handling game progression. To keep with the theme of slowly improving one's art skills over time, colors quest has a daily system for progressing through its levels. Players are given one drawing task daily, with a specific theme and certain stipulations that must be fulfilled. Challenging the player to think outside the box. The game's very first challenge is having you draw something you desire. Upon doing so, the adventure begins and you are set on a quest to receive said item.

References

External links 

Android (operating system) software
Digital art
Graphics software
IOS software
Nintendo 3DS eShop games
Nintendo DS games
Nintendo Network games
Nintendo Switch games
PlayStation Network games
PlayStation Vita games
Raster graphics editors
Video games developed in Sweden